Capital punishment was formerly used by the state of Minnesota until its abolition in 1911.

Between 1860 and 1906, 27 people were executed by hanging in Minnesota. Following the botched execution of murderer William Williams in 1906, public opinion in the state turned against the death penalty. In 1911, an abolition bill was signed into law, outlawing the death penalty in Minnesota.

Since 1911, there have been 23 attempts to reinstate the death penalty in Minnesota, with the most recent being in 2005, but none of these bills passed the Minnesota Legislature.

See also
 Capital punishment in the United States
 Capital punishment by country

References

 
Minnesota